This is a list of amphibians found in Mexico. A total of 366 amphibian species have been recorded in Mexico, 3 of which are extinct. This list is derived from the database listing of AmphibiaWeb.

Caecilians (Gymnophiona)

Dermophiidae 
Order: Gymnophiona. 
Family: Dermophiidae
Dermophis mexicanus (VU)
Dermophis oaxacae (DD)

Salamanders (Caudata)

Ambystomatidae 
Order: Caudata. 
Family: Ambystomatidae
Ambystoma altamirani (EN)
Ambystoma amblycephalum (CR)
Ambystoma andersoni (CR)
Ambystoma bombypellum (CR)
Ambystoma dumerilii (CR)
Ambystoma flavipiperatum (DD)
Ambystoma granulosum (CR)
Ambystoma leorae (CR)
Ambystoma lermaense (CR)
Ambystoma mexicanum (CR)
Ambystoma ordinarium (EN)
Ambystoma rivulare (DD)
Ambystoma rosaceum (LC)
Ambystoma silvense (DD)
Ambystoma taylori (CR)
Ambystoma tigrinum (LC)
Ambystoma velasci (LC)

Plethodontidae 
Order: Caudata. 
Family: Plethodontidae
Aneides lugubris (LC)
Batrachoseps major (LC)
Bolitoglossa alberchi (LC)
Bolitoglossa chinanteca 
Bolitoglossa flavimembris (EN)
Bolitoglossa flaviventris (EN)
Bolitoglossa franklini (EN)
Bolitoglossa hartwegi (NT)
Bolitoglossa hermosa (NT)
Bolitoglossa lincolni (NT)
Bolitoglossa macrinii (NT)
Bolitoglossa mexicana (LC)
Bolitoglossa oaxacensis (DD)
Bolitoglossa occidentalis (LC)
Bolitoglossa platydactyla (NT)
Bolitoglossa riletti (EN)
Bolitoglossa rostrata (VU)
Bolitoglossa rufescens (LC)
Bolitoglossa stuarti (DD)
Bolitoglossa veracrucis (EN)
Bolitoglossa yucatana (LC)
Bolitoglossa zapoteca (DD)
Chiropterotriton arboreus (CR)
Chiropterotriton chiropterus (CR)
Chiropterotriton chondrostega (EN)
Chiropterotriton cracens (EN)
Chiropterotriton dimidiatus (EN)
Chiropterotriton lavae (CR)
Chiropterotriton magnipes (CR)
Chiropterotriton mosaueri (DD)
Chiropterotriton multidentatus (EN)
Chiropterotriton orculus (VU)
Chiropterotriton priscus (NT)
Chiropterotriton terrestris (CR)
Cryptotriton adelos (EN)
Cryptotriton alvarezdeltoroi (EN)
Dendrotriton megarhinus (VU)
Dendrotriton xolocalcae (VU)
Ensatina eschscholtzii (LC)
Ixalotriton niger (CR)
Ixalotriton parvus (CR)
Nyctanolis pernix (EN)
Oedipina elongata (LC)
Parvimolge townsendi (CR)
Pseudoeurycea ahuitzotl (CR)
Pseudoeurycea altamontana (EN)
Pseudoeurycea amuzga (DD)
Pseudoeurycea anitae (CR)
Pseudoeurycea aquatica (CR)
Pseudoeurycea aurantia (VU)
Pseudoeurycea bellii (VU)
Pseudoeurycea boneti (VU)
Pseudoeurycea brunnata (CR)
Pseudoeurycea cafetalera 
Pseudoeurycea cephalica (NT)
Pseudoeurycea cochranae (EN)
Pseudoeurycea conanti (EN)
Pseudoeurycea firscheini (EN)
Pseudoeurycea gadovii (EN)
Pseudoeurycea galeanae (NT)
Pseudoeurycea gigantea (CR)
Pseudoeurycea goebeli (CR)
Pseudoeurycea juarezi (CR)
Pseudoeurycea leprosa (VU)
Pseudoeurycea lineola (EN)
Pseudoeurycea longicauda (EN)
Pseudoeurycea lynchi (CR)
Pseudoeurycea maxima (DD)
Pseudoeurycea melanomolga (EN)
Pseudoeurycea mixcoatl (DD)
Pseudoeurycea mixteca (LC)
Pseudoeurycea mystax (EN)
Pseudoeurycea naucampatepetl (CR)
Pseudoeurycea nigromaculata (CR)
Pseudoeurycea obesa (DD)
Pseudoeurycea orchileucos (EN)
Pseudoeurycea orchimelas (EN)
Pseudoeurycea papenfussi (NT)
Pseudoeurycea praecellens (CR)
Pseudoeurycea quetzalanensis (DD)
Pseudoeurycea robertsi (CR)
Pseudoeurycea ruficauda (DD)
Pseudoeurycea saltator (CR)
Pseudoeurycea scandens (VU)
Pseudoeurycea smithi (CR)
Pseudoeurycea tenchalli (EN)
Pseudoeurycea teotepec (EN)
Pseudoeurycea tlahcuiloh (CR)
Pseudoeurycea tlilicxitl (DD)
Pseudoeurycea unguidentis (CR)
Pseudoeurycea werleri (EN)
Thorius arboreus (EN)
Thorius aureus (CR)
Thorius boreas (EN)
Thorius dubitus (EN)
Thorius grandis (EN)
Thorius infernalis (CR)
Thorius insperatus (DD)
Thorius lunaris (EN)
Thorius macdougalli (VU)
Thorius magnipes (CR)
Thorius minutissimus (CR)
Thorius minydemus (CR)
Thorius munificus (CR)
Thorius narismagnus (CR)
Thorius narisovalis (CR)
Thorius omiltemi (EN)
Thorius papaloae (EN)
Thorius pennatulus (CR)
Thorius pulmonaris (EN)
Thorius schmidti (EN)
Thorius smithi (CR)
Thorius spilogaster (CR)
Thorius troglodytes (EN)

Salamandridae 
Order: Caudata. 
Family: Salamandridae
Notophthalmus meridionalis (EN)

Sirenidae 
Order: Caudata. 
Family: Sirenidae
Siren intermedia (LC)

Frogs and Toads (Anura)

Bufonidae 
Order: Anura. 
Family: Bufonidae
Anaxyrus boreas (NT)
Anaxyrus californicus (EN)
Anaxyrus cognatus (LC)
Anaxyrus compactilis (LC)
Anaxyrus debilis (LC)
Anaxyrus kelloggi (LC)
Anaxyrus mexicanus (NT)
Anaxyrus microscaphus (LC)
Anaxyrus punctatus (LC)
Anaxyrus retiformis (LC)
Anaxyrus speciosus (LC)
Anaxyrus woodhousii (LC)
Incilius alvarius (LC)
Incilius bocourti (LC)
Incilius campbelli (NT)
Incilius canaliferus (LC)
Incilius cavifrons (EN)
Incilius coccifer (LC)
Incilius cristatus (CR)
Incilius cycladen (VU)
Incilius gemmifer (EN)
Incilius macrocristatus (VU)
Incilius marmoreus (LC)
Incilius mazatlanensis (LC)
Incilius mccoyi 
Incilius nebulifer (LC)
Incilius occidentalis (LC)
Incilius perplexus (EN)
Incilius pisinnus (DD)
Incilius spiculatus (EN)
Incilius tacanensis (EN)
Incilius tutelarius (EN)
Incilius valliceps (LC)
Rhinella marina (LC)

Centrolenidae 
Order: Anura. 
Family: Centrolenidae
Hyalinobatrachium fleischmanni (LC)

Craugastoridae 
Order: Anura. 
Family: Craugastoridae
Craugastor alfredi (VU)
Craugastor augusti (LC)
Craugastor batrachylus (DD)
Craugastor berkenbuschii (NT)
Craugastor brocchi (VU)
Craugastor decoratus (VU)
Craugastor galacticorhinus 
Craugastor glaucus (CR)
Craugastor greggi (CR)
Craugastor guerreroensis (CR)
Craugastor hobartsmithi (EN)
Craugastor laticeps (NT)
Craugastor lineatus (CR)
Craugastor loki (LC)
Craugastor matudai (VU)
Craugastor megalotympanum (CR)
Craugastor mexicanus (LC)
Craugastor occidentalis (DD)
Craugastor omiltemanus (EN)
Craugastor palenque (DD)
Craugastor polymniae (CR)
Craugastor pozo (CR)
Craugastor pygmaeus (VU)
Craugastor rhodopis (VU)
Craugastor rugulosus (LC)
Craugastor saltator 
Craugastor sartori 
Craugastor silvicola (EN)
Craugastor spatulatus (EN)
Craugastor stuarti (EN)
Craugastor tarahumaraensis (VU)
Craugastor taylori (DD)
Craugastor uno (EN)
Craugastor vocalis (LC)
Craugastor vulcani (EN)
Craugastor yucatanensis (NT)

Eleutherodactylidae 
Order: Anura. 
Family: Eleutherodactylidae
Eleutherodactylus angustidigitorum (VU)
Eleutherodactylus cystignathoides (LC)
Eleutherodactylus dennisi (EN)
Eleutherodactylus dilatus (EN)
Eleutherodactylus dixoni (CR)
Eleutherodactylus grandis (CR)
Eleutherodactylus guttilatus (LC)
Eleutherodactylus interorbitalis (DD)
Eleutherodactylus leprus (VU)
Eleutherodactylus longipes (VU)
Eleutherodactylus maurus (DD)
Eleutherodactylus modestus (VU)
Eleutherodactylus nitidus (LC)
Eleutherodactylus nivicolimae (VU)
Eleutherodactylus pallidus (DD)
Eleutherodactylus pipilans (LC)
Eleutherodactylus planirostris (LC)
Eleutherodactylus rubrimaculatus (VU)
Eleutherodactylus rufescens (CR)
Eleutherodactylus saxatilis (EN)
Eleutherodactylus syristes (EN)
Eleutherodactylus teretistes (DD)
Eleutherodactylus verrucipes (VU)
Eleutherodactylus verruculatus (DD)

Hylidae 
Order: Anura. 
Family: Hylidae
Acris blanchardi 
Agalychnis callidryas (LC)
Agalychnis moreletii (CR)
Anotheca spinosa (LC)
Bromeliohyla dendroscarta (CR)
Charadrahyla altipotens (CR)
Charadrahyla chaneque (EN)
Charadrahyla nephila (VU)
Charadrahyla taeniopus (VU)
Charadrahyla tecuani 
Charadrahylaa trux (CR)
Dendropsophus ebraccatus (LC)
Dendropsophus microcephalus (LC)
Dendropsophus robertmertensi (LC)
Dendropsophus sartori (LC)
Duellmanohyla chamulae (EN)
Duellmanohyla ignicolor (EN)
Duellmanohyla schmidtorum (VU)
Ecnomiohyla echinata (CR)
Ecnomiohyla miotympanum (NT)
Ecnomiohyla valancifer (CR)
Exerodonta abdivita (DD)
Exerodonta bivocata (DD)
Exerodonta chimalapa (EN)
Exerodonta juanitae (VU)
Exerodonta melanomma (VU)
Exerodonta pinorum (VU)
Exerodonta smaragdina (LC)
Exerodonta sumichrasti (LC)
Exerodonta xera (VU)
Hyla arboricola (DD)
Hyla arenicolor (LC)
Hyla euphorbiacea (NT)
Hyla eximia (LC)
Hyla plicata (LC)
Hyla walkeri (VU)
Hyla wrightorum (LC)
Megastomatohyla mixe (CR)
Megastomatohyla mixomaculata (EN)
Megastomatohyla nubicola (EN)
Megastomatohyla pellita (CR)
Pachymedusa dacnicolor (LC)
Plectrohyla acanthodes (CR)
Plectrohyla ameibothalame (DD)
Plectrohyla arborescandens (EN)
Plectrohyla avia (CR)
Plectrohyla bistincta (LC)
Plectrohyla calthula (CR)
Plectrohyla calvicollina (CR)
Plectrohyla celata (CR)
Plectrohyla cembra (CR)
Plectrohyla charadricola (EN)
Plectrohyla chryses (CR)
Plectrohyla crassa (CR)
Plectrohyla cyanomma (CR)
Plectrohyla cyclada (EN)
Plectrohyla ephemera (CR)
Plectrohyla guatemalensis (CR)
Plectrohyla hartwegi (CR)
Plectrohyla hazelae (CR)
Plectrohyla ixil (CR)
Plectrohyla labedactyla (DD)
Plectrohyla lacertosa (EN)
Plectrohyla matudai (VU)
Plectrohyla miahuatlanensis (DD)
Plectrohyla mykter (EN)
Plectrohyla pachyderma (CR)
Plectrohyla pentheter (EN)
Plectrohyla psarosema (CR)
Plectrohyla pycnochila (CR)
Plectrohyla robertsorum (EN)
Plectrohyla sabrina (CR)
Plectrohyla sagorum (EN)
Plectrohyla siopela (CR)
Plectrohyla thorectes (CR)
Pseudacris cadaverina (LC)
Pseudacris clarkii (LC)
Pseudacris regilla (LC)
Ptychohyla erythromma (EN)
Ptychohyla euthysanota (NT)
Ptychohyla leonhardschultzei (EN)
Ptychohyla macrotympanum (CR)
Scinax staufferi (LC)
Smilisca baudinii (LC)
Smilisca cyanosticta (NT)
Smilisca dentata (EN)
Smilisca fodiens (LC)
Tlalocohyla godmani (VU)
Tlalocohyla loquax (LC)
Tlalocohyla picta (LC)
Tlalocohyla smithii (LC)
Trachycephalus venulosus (LC)
Triprion petasatus (LC)
Triprion spatulatus (LC)

Leptodactylidae 
Order: Anura. 
Family: Leptodactylidae
Engystomops pustulosus (LC)
Leptodactylus fragilis (LC)
Leptodactylus melanonotus (LC)

Microhylidae 
Order: Anura. 
Family: Microhylidae
Gastrophryne elegans (LC)
Gastrophryne olivacea (LC)
Gastrophryne usta (LC)
Hypopachus barberi (VU)
Hypopachus variolosus (LC)

Pipidae 
Order: Anura. 
Family: Pipidae
Xenopus laevis (LC)

Ranidae 
Order: Anura. 
Family: Ranidae
Rana aurora (LC)
Rana berlandieri (LC)
Rana boylii (NT)
Rana brownorum 
Rana catesbeiana (LC)
Rana chichicuahutla (CR)
Rana chiricahuensis (VU)
Rana dunni (EN)
Rana forreri (LC)
Rana johni (EN)
Rana lemosespinali (DD)
Rana maculata (LC)
Rana magnaocularis (LC)
Rana megapoda (VU)
Rana montezumae (LC)
Rana neovolcanica (NT)
Rana omiltemana (CR)
Rana psilonota (DD)
Rana pueblae (CR)
Rana pustulosa (LC)
Rana sierramadrensis (VU)
Rana spectabilis (LC)
Rana tarahumarae (VU)
Rana tlaloci (CR)
Rana vaillanti (LC)
Rana yavapaiensis (LC)
Rana zweifeli (LC)

Rhinophrynidae 
Order: Anura. 
Family: Rhinophrynidae
Rhinophrynus dorsalis (LC)

Scaphiopodidae 
Order: Anura. 
Family: Scaphiopodidae
Scaphiopus couchii (LC)
Spea bombifrons (LC)
Spea hammondii (NT)
Spea multiplicata (LC)

Notes

References 

 
Amphibians
Mexico
Mexico